Kaolin Township is an inactive township in Iron County, in the U.S. state of Missouri.

Kaolin Township was established in 1857, and named for deposits of kaolin within its borders.

References

Townships in Missouri
Townships in Iron County, Missouri